Defending champions Marcelo Arévalo and Jean-Julien Rojer defeated Rinky Hijikata and Reese Stalder in the final, 6–3, 6–4 to win the doubles tennis title at the 2023 Delray Beach Open.

Seeds

Draw

Draw

References

External links
 Main draw

Delray Beach Open - Doubles
2023 Doubles
Delray Beach Open – Doubles
Delray Beach Open – Doubles